Rolim de Moura Esporte Clube, commonly known as Rolim de Moura, was a Brazilian football club based in Rolim de Moura, Rondônia state.

History
The club was founded on 1 November 2002. They finished in the second position in the Campeonato Rondoniense Second Level in 2007.

Stadium
Rolim de Moura Esporte Clube played their home games at Estádio José Ângelo Cassol, nicknamed Cassolão. The stadium has a maximum capacity of 5,000 people.

References

Defunct football clubs in Rondônia
Association football clubs established in 2002
Association football clubs disestablished in 2020
2002 establishments in Brazil
2020 disestablishments in Brazil